Dystrobrevin alpha is a protein that in humans is encoded by the DTNA gene.

Function 

The protein encoded by this gene belongs to the dystrobrevin subfamily and the dystrophin family. This protein is a component of the dystrophin-associated protein complex (DPC). The DPC consists of dystrophin and several integral and peripheral membrane proteins, including dystroglycans, sarcoglycans, syntrophins and alpha- and beta-dystrobrevin. The DPC localizes to the sarcolemma and its disruption is associated with various forms of muscular dystrophy. This protein may be involved in the formation and stability of synapses as well as the clustering of nicotinic acetylcholine receptors. Multiple alternatively spliced transcript variants encoding different isoforms have been identified.

Clinical significance 

Mutations in DTNA are associated with Ménière's disease.

Interactions 

Dystrobrevin has been shown to interact with dystrophin.

References

Further reading